This is an incomplete list of compositions by Jean Langlais. Langlais was a prolific composer, composing 254 works with opus numbers.

Opus list 

Langlais, Jean